Wadi El Gemal National Park is a national park in Egypt.

The coastal area features coral reefs with 450 species of coral and over 1200 species of fish. Approximately 17% of the marine life is native to the Red Sea. It also includes five islands, including Wadi El Gemal Island. These islands are a breeding ground for 13 bird species, and local sea grasses are important sources of food for the endangered dugong and green turtle.

The coast of Wadi el Gemal is partially rocky with broad spots covered by mangroves which are particularly widespread in the south where there is the largest mangrove forest of the entire Red Sea.

There are also various sandy beaches suitable for snorkeling and scuba diving along the shores of Wadi El Gemal Park.

The inland area is home to many animals, including the Dorcas gazelle and the Nubian Ibex.

The park is the site of prehistoric rock art, as well as Ptolemaic and Roman ruins, and the mountain Mons Smaragdus is the site of small mining communities that date back to ancient Egypt.

Wadi El Gemal is an IUCN Category II park, established in 2003.

References

External links 
 Ministry of Environment Egyptian Environmental Affairs Agency - Natural Protectorates Description

National parks of Egypt
Protected areas established in 2003
IUCN Category II
Red Sea coastal desert
2003 establishments in Egypt